Philodromus cammarus is a spider species found in the Balkans.

See also 
 List of Philodromidae species

References 

cammarus
Spiders of Europe
Spiders described in 1846